Donald E. Meehan (born April 10, 1951) is a Canadian National Hockey League Players' Association (NHLPA) hockey player agent.

Early career 
Meehan earned his bachelor's degree at Sir George Williams University. At McGill University, during his final year of law school, Meehan played for the Redmen as a wide receiver under coach Charlie Baillie.

After earning his law degree (LLB 1975) at McGill, Meehan was hired by Toronto law firm Blaney, Pasternak. Most of the cases he originally dealt with were corporate and tax-related. The firm also had some ice hockey players as clientele.

Newport Sports Management 
Declining the offer of a partnership from his law firm, Meehan decided in 1981 to create his own company that focused on hockey players. Named Newport Sports Management Inc. and operated in a partnership with fellow agent Pat Morris, it represents over 100 NHL players.

Instead of approaching players that are already in the National Hockey League (NHL), Meehan approached the families of young talents before they were drafted by the NHL. One of the first young talents Meehan was an agent for was the talented centre Pat LaFontaine—LaFontaine hired Meehan a few months before he entered the 1983 NHL Entry Draft.

Current NHL clients 
Justin Abdelkader, Detroit Red Wings
Josh Bailey, New York Islanders
Jay Beagle, Arizona Coyotes
Tyler Bozak, free agent
Cal Clutterbuck, New York Islanders
Matt Cullen, Minnesota Wild
Michael Del Zotto, Vancouver Canucks
Drew Doughty, Los Angeles Kings
Jordan Eberle, Seattle Kraken
Jonathan Ericsson, Detroit Red Wings
Justin Falk, Buffalo Sabres
Nick Foligno, Boston Bruins
Travis Hamonic, Vancouver Canucks
Patric Hörnqvist, Florida Panthers
Erik Karlsson, San Jose Sharks
Evander Kane, Edmonton Oilers
Phil Kessel, Arizona Coyotes
Robin Lehner, Vegas Golden Knights
Trevor Lewis, Calgary Flames
Derek MacKenzie, Florida Panthers
Matt Martin, New York Islanders
Shawn Matthias, Winnipeg Jets
Chris Mueller, Toronto Maple Leafs
James Neal, free agent
Cal O'Reilly, Minnesota Wild
Ryan O'Reilly, St. Louis Blues
Zach Parise, New York Islanders
Jeff Petry, Pittsburgh Penguins
Corey Perry,  Tampa Bay Lightning
Alex Pietrangelo, Vegas Golden Knights
Kyle Quincey, Minnesota Wild
Brad Richardson, Calgary Flames
Luke Schenn, Vancouver Canucks
Steven Stamkos, Tampa Bay Lightning
P. K. Subban, free agent
Brandon Sutter, Vancouver Canucks
Matt Taormina, Montreal Canadiens
Matthew Tkachuk, Calgary Flames
Mats Zuccarello, Minnesota Wild

Current and former clients active outside the NHL
Luke Adam, Adler Mannheim
Keith Aulie, EHC Red Bull München
Drayson Bowman, Colorado Eagles
Darryl Boyce, Düsseldorfer EG
Dustin Boyd, Dynamo Moscow
Mike Brodeur, free agent
Troy Brouwer, free agent
Brett Carson, SaiPa
Matt Corrente, free agent
Nikita Filatov, HC Neftekhimik Nizhnekamsk
Alexander Frolov, Amur Khabarovsk
Nicklas Grossmann, Södertälje SK
Matthew Halischuk, free agent
Martin Hanzal, free agent
Jarome Iginla, free agent
Ryan Jones, Kölner Haie
Andrei Kostitsyn,  Kunlun Red Star
Sergei Kostitsyn, HC Dinamo Minsk
Maxim Lapierre, HC Lugano
Chad LaRose, Orlando Solar Bears
Brandon McMillan, Dinamo Riga
Brendan Mikkelson, Luleå HF
Kris Newbury, Fischtown Pinguins
Dion Phaneuf, free agent
Mike Ribeiro, free agent
Mike Richards, free agent
Mike Santorelli, Genève-Servette HC
James Sheppard, Eisbären Berlin
Nick Spaling, Genève-Servette HC
Viktor Stalberg, EV Zug
Henrik Tallinder, free agent
Jordin Tootoo, free agent
Tom Wandell, Örebro HK
Jeremy Williams, Straubing Tigers
Ryan Wilson, KalPa
Nolan Yonkman, JYP

Retired clients formerly in the NHL
Colby Armstrong
Jason Arnott
Alex Auld
Todd Bertuzzi
Paul Bissonnette
Francis Bouillon
Tim Brent
Eric Brewer
Patrice Brisebois
Ilya Bryzgalov
Gregory Campbell
Luca Caputi
Dan Carcillo
Erik Christensen
Wendel Clark
David Clarkson
Mike Commodore
Matt Cooke
Ryan Craig
Matt Ellis
Steve Eminger
John Erskine
Tim Gleason
Matt Greene
Scott Hannan
Josh Harding
Derian Hatcher
Kristian Huselius
Pat LaFontaine
Mike Johnson
Curtis Joseph
Ed Jovanovski
Pascal Leclaire
Brian Lee
David Legwand
Nicklas Lidström
Trevor Linden
Al MacInnis
Dave Manson
Brad May
Jay McKee
Fredrik Modin
Travis Moen
Ethan Moreau
Evgeni Nabokov
Scott Niedermayer
Eric Nystrom
Patrick O'Sullivan
Nathan Oystrick
Michael Peca
Chris Pronger
Brandon Prust
Wade Redden
Brad Richards
Craig Rivet
Bryan Rodney
Mike Sillinger
Steve Staios
Matt Stajan
Jarret Stoll
Jason Strudwick
Brent Sutter
Andy Sutton
Danny Syvret
José Théodore
Ole-Kristian Tollefsen
Mike Van Ryn
Scott Walker
Stephen Weiss
Jeff Woywitka

Previous and now former NHL clients
Alexander Ovechkin, Washington Capitals
Nik Antropov, Atlanta Thrashers , Andy Strickland, June 19, 2009.

Other notable clients 
Ron MacLean, Host of Hockey Night in Canada
Vladislav Tretiak, Former Soviet national and CSKA Moscow goaltender, Goaltender consultant for the Chicago Blackhawks

See also
David Falk, an NBA agent.
Scott Boras, a Major League Baseball agent.

References

General references
Who's who: player agents
Newport Sports Management Inc.
Playing the Game: Don Meehan Win Respect and Top Salaries
Oilers regret having to trade Ryan Smyth
Hab's Perezhogin signs with Russian team
Markov Inks Four-Year Deal With Habs
Sutter Silent on Coach, Player Contracts
Avalanche adds a true warrior in Ryan Smyth
Buffalo Sabres re-sign Maxim Afinogenov to multi-year contract
In the Spotlight: Stoll dominates faceoffs for Oilers
The Stanley Cup: Adams savors his Stanley Cup experience
Sundin hard to fit under salary cap
Capitals' Ovechkin Fires Agent Meehan

Living people
Sir George Williams University alumni
American sports agents
1951 births
McGill University Faculty of Law alumni